Jaguaribara is a municipality in the state of Ceará in the Northeast region of Brazil.

The municipality contains part of the reservoir of the Castanhão Dam, the largest in the state.

See also
List of municipalities in Ceará

References

Municipalities in Ceará